Boone Township is an inactive township in Maries County, in the U.S. state of Missouri.

Boone Township has the name of Nathaniel Boone, a pioneer citizen.

References

Townships in Missouri
Townships in Maries County, Missouri